Horodiște may refer to:

Horodiște, Călărași, a commune in Călărași district, Moldova
Horodiște, Dondușeni, a commune in Dondușeni district, Moldova
Horodiște, Rezina, a commune in Rezina district, and its village of Slobozia-Horodişte, Moldova
Horodiște, Rîșcani, a commune in Rîșcani district, Moldova

See also 
 Horodiștea (disambiguation)